The canton of Saint-Maixent-l'École is an administrative division of the Deux-Sèvres department, western France. It was created at the French canton reorganisation which came into effect in March 2015. Its seat is in Saint-Maixent-l'École.

It consists of the following communes:
 
Augé
Azay-le-Brûlé
La Crèche
Exireuil
François
Nanteuil
Romans
Sainte-Eanne
Sainte-Néomaye
Saint-Maixent-l'École
Saint-Martin-de-Saint-Maixent
Saivres
Souvigné

References

Cantons of Deux-Sèvres